The Burkina Faso women's national basketball team is a national basketball team of Burkina Faso, governed by the Fédération Burkinabe de Basketball.

Its last appearance was at the 2013 FIBA Africa Championship for Women qualification stage.

See also
Burkina Faso women's national under-19 basketball team
Burkina Faso women's national under-17 basketball team

References

External links
Archived records of Burkina Faso team participations

Basketball in Burkina Faso
Basketball teams in Burkina Faso
Women's national basketball teams
Basketball